VFR may refer to:

 Visual flight rules, a set of aviation regulations
 Variable frame rate, a feature of some video container formats in which the frame rate can change over time
 Honda VF and VFR, a series of motorcycles
 Verein für Raumschiffahrt (German: "Spaceflight Society"), an association of amateur rocket enthusiasts active in Germany from 1927 to 1933
 Visiting friends and relatives, a term used in the study of international travel